The Air-Sport Chinook is a Polish single-place, paraglider that was designed and produced by Air-Sport of Zakopane. It is now out of production.

The glider is also referred to as the Chinooka in Polish.

Design and development
The Chinook is named after a local wind found in North America. It was designed as a cross country glider and was noted in 2003 as being very competitively priced.

The models are each named for their wing area in square metres.

Variants
Chinook
Original version
Chinook 2 26
Chinook 2 28

Specifications (Chinook 28)

References

Chinook
Paragliders